Alan Alfred Cadby (born 4 October 1947) is an Australian politician. He was a member of the Western Australian Legislative Council from 2001 to 2005, representing the Liberal Party from 2001 to 2004, and serving as an independent from 2004 to 2005, for the seven-member North Metropolitan Region.

He is most well known for providing the crucial last vote in order to pass one vote one value legislation abolishing the state's rural gerrymander, which had been stalled in a deadlocked Legislative Council for some years. Cadby had been bound to oppose the legislation as a member of the Liberal Party, but when, in early 2004, he lost preselection to recontest his seat after a challenge from Peter Collier, he quit the party and became an independent. As an independent, he promptly provided the final vote necessary, ensuring the passage of the legislation. However the Liberal Party was aware of Cadby's support of the principle of one vote one value (Electoral Amendment Bill 2001) in November 2001 when Cadby approached Jeremy Buxton, Liberal strategist, stating that he would have great difficulty in speaking out against the Bill when it arrived in the Legislative Council as Cadby believed in the principle of one vote one value. A compromise was reached on his stance with Buxton providing Cadby with a set of general notes that he could use in his speech as a generic view on the value of a vote. This speech was delivered on 28 November 2001.

Along with the Liberal member for Ningaloo Rod Sweetman, Alan Cadby offered to serve out his parliamentary term as a Family First Party member. Rod Sweetman's offer was later rejected by that party due to Rod Sweetman supporting a bill for decriminalisation of abortion in 1998.  Alan Cadby withdrew his candidature for the Party following the treatment of Rod Sweetman by Family First.

Independents have traditionally struggled in the Legislative Council, and facing near-certain defeat, Cadby decided to retire at the 2005 state election.

References

External links

Members of the Western Australian Legislative Council
Liberal Party of Australia members of the Parliament of Western Australia
1947 births
Living people
21st-century Australian politicians